The second of three 1951 Buenos Aires Grand Prix (official name: V Gran Premio Extraordinario de Eva Duarte Perón) was a Formula Libre Grand Prix motor race that took place on February 25, 1951, at the Costanero Norte street circuit in Buenos Aires, Argentina.

Classification

References

Buenos Aires Grand Prix (II)
Buenos Aires Grand Prix (II)
Buenos Aires Grand Prix